A63 or A-63 may refer to:
 A63 road, a road in England connecting Leeds and Hull
 A63 motorway (France), a road connecting Bordeaux and the border with Spain
 A63 motorway (Germany), a road connecting Mainz and Kaiserslautern
 A63 motorway (Spain), a road connecting Oviedo and Canero
 Encyclopaedia of Chess Openings code for the Benoni Defense